Polsat News is a Polish news channel, launched on 7 June 2008 at 7:00am (UTC+1). Being a part of the Polsat Network, Polsat News is owned by Polsat Group. It is available over Cyfrowy Polsat, nc+ and UPC Poland digital platforms in Poland. It is broadcast on Hot Bird 6, 11158V, 27500 3/4.

History
Polsat News started broadcasting on 7 June 2008 thirty seconds before the 7am hour (UTC+1). Polsat News is the first Polish news channel to broadcast in 16:9 format. From 7 June to 14 July the channel was broadcast in test emission. Up to September, the channel was broadcast as FTA.

The live programme is broadcast from 6am to 24:00 (UTC+1). The news programmes are broadcast every half an hour. The channel hires about 400 people.

On 1 August 2008 Polsat News started broadcasting adverts.

Programmes are split into three parts: morning - Nowy Dzień (New Day), afternoon - To jest dzień (It's the day) and evening - To był dzień (That Was a Day).

On 6 June 2008 Polsat News opened a TV studio, in which its programs are recorded and where Wydarzenia (main Polsat news program) are recorded. Its  cost was €6,000,000.

An HD version for this channel was launched on 3 February 2014 for a crystal clear vision of the network.

Polsat News, including with other neighbouring Polsat channels, started teasing their rebranding on 31 July 2021. The logo change took effect on 30 August 2021, including TVN7.

Programmes
 Informacje (News, every half an hour)
 Informacje dnia (News of the Day, an evening news report, 9:00pm)
 Pogoda (Weather)
 Sport (Sport)
 Nowy dzień (New Day, block programming from 6:00am to 10am) - also in Polsat from 6am to 9am every day
 To jest dzień (That Is a Day, block programming from 11am to 20:00 or 8pm)
 To był dzień (That Was a Day, evening report, 20:00 to 21:00 or 8pm - 9pm)
 To był dzień na świecie (That Was a Day in the World, an evening report of current affairs around the world, 9:30pm – 10pm)
 Sportowe podsumowanie dnia (an evening sport report)
 Wydarzenia (Events, Polsat news service, 3:50pm and 6:50pm)
 Biznes Informacje (Business News) - prepare business journalists Polsat News and journalists TV Biznes
 Interwencja Extra (coverage of affairs that are minor but often controversial)
 Graffiti (a political morning talk show)
 Ostatnia instancja (The Last Instance)
 Gość "Wydarzeń" (Guest "Events", a news service)
 Debata (Debate) - also in TV Biznes
 Encyklopedia zdrowia (Health Encyclopedia)
 Czarny punkt (Black Point)
 Nie daj się fiskusowi (Cope with the Tax Office) - also in TV Biznes

Logo history

Regional centres

See also 
 Polsat

References

External links

Polsat
Television channels in Poland
Television channels and stations established in 2008
Polish news websites